Julia Powers (née Gorchakova) is a ballroom dance champion and fitness program creator.

Biography
Julia Powers is a Russian-American ballroom dancer, and was born in St. Petersburg, Russia.  She received dance instruction from her mother as a child,  and danced in Japan and in East Russia as a young woman. In 1991, she moved to Arizona to develop a dance partnership with Bob Powers; they married in 1993.

Awards
12 Times United States Rhythm Champions.
3 Times World Professional Mambo Champions
Finalists, World Latin-American Showdance Championships
Can-Am Open Professional American Rhythm Champions

Television
They have been featured on PBS's Championship Ballroom Dancing, GTV DanceSport, as well as The Heritage Classic hosted by Cyd Charisse.

Current Projects
Powers is an adjudicator with the National Dance Council of America
member of the World Dance Arts Foundation, and co-organizer of the Sunburst Ball.

Powers's latest endeavor is Core Rhythms, which she co-created with another ballroom champion, Jaana Kunitz.  Core Rhythms is a Latin-dance-based fitness program, that has been featured on infomercials and QVC, and included endorsements from Mary Murphy of So You Think You Can Dance and Len Goodman & Tony Dovolani of Dancing with the Stars.

The program is led in-person at the Champion Ballroom Academy, in San Diego, California.

Powers is also a clothing designer, creating custom dancewear.

In 2007, Powers returned to the competition floor to compete with Emmanuel Pierre-Antoine.

See also
U.S. National Dancesport Champions (Professional Rhythm)
Champion Ballroom Academy

References

External links
World Dance Arts Web Site
The Sunburst Ball Website

Soviet emigrants to the United States
American ballroom dancers
Living people
Exercise instructors
Russian ballroom dancers
Russian female dancers
American female dancers
Year of birth missing (living people)
21st-century Russian dancers
20th-century Russian dancers
20th-century Russian women
21st-century American women